Cerodontha is a genus of leaf miner flies in the family Agromyzidae. There are more than 280 described species in Cerodontha.

See also
 List of Cerodontha species

References

Further reading

External links

 

Agromyzidae
Articles created by Qbugbot
Opomyzoidea genera